Legionella donaldsonii is a Gram-negative, aerobic, non-spore-forming bacterium from the genus Legionella.

References 

Legionellales